Slađan Šćepović (Serbian Cyrillic: Cлaђaн Шћeпoвић, born 5 December 1965) is a Serbian football manager and former player.

Career
Born in Priboj, SR Serbia within SFR Yugoslavia, he played most of his career with FK Partizan in the Yugoslav First League between 1984 and 1992, with an exception of a short spell with FK Bor while still in his beginning of career. Within the club he soon became an important player despite the concurrence for the striker position, and the Yugoslav league in those days was considered to be one of the most competitive ones. He won one championship, two cups and one Supercup. He is specially remembered among Partizan fans for scoring the decisive goal in a tied match with Celtic Glasgow that ended 6-6 on aggregate, with goals away advantage for Partizan, and made them advance into the 1/8 finals of the 1989 UEFA Cup Winners Cup.

In 1992, he moved to Cyprus where he played with then highly motivated Apollon Limassol for four seasons in the Cypriot First Division becoming immediately in his first season a league top scorer. Beside winning one championship and being league's top scorer, he also lost two Cypriot Cup finals, in 1993 and 1995.

In 1996, he moved to Spain and signed with CP Mérida having played with the club in their historical season when they were promoted for first time in history to the Spanish La Liga by winning the Segunda División, Spanish second league. However he left that summer and retired from active playing.

He played most of his career as forward or striker. In July 2013 the Spanish EFE news agency wrongly stated that Sladan was a Goalkeeper, being rectified in Stefan Scepovic's website.

After retiring he has worked as coach of youth squads of FK Partizan.

Honours
Club:
 Partizan
Yugoslav First League (1): 1986–87
Yugoslav Cup (2): 1988–89 and 1992
Yugoslav Supercup (1): 1989
 Apollon Limassol
Cypriot First Division (1): 1993–94
 Mérida
Spanish Second League (1): 1996–97

Individual:
Cypriot First Division top scorer (1): 1992–93 (25 goals)

Personal life
Slađan Šćepović has two sons all of them footballers. His son, Marko followed the tradition of his father becoming a Partizan player and has played with them in the 2010–11 UEFA Champions League. His other son, a year older than Marko, Stefan, now playing for AEL Limassol, has already been playing for the Serbian under-21 team and has played already in the Serbian SuperLiga with OFK Belgrade, in Italy and in Belgium. Curiously, all father and sons are forwards.

References

External sources
 
 
 Stats from Yugoslav Leagues at Zerodic

1965 births
Living people
People from Priboj
Yugoslav footballers
Serbian footballers
Serbian expatriate footballers
Association football forwards
Yugoslav First League players
FK Partizan players
FK Bor players
Cypriot First Division players
Apollon Limassol FC players
Expatriate footballers in Cyprus
Segunda División players
CP Mérida footballers
Expatriate footballers in Spain
Serbian football managers
Serbian expatriate sportspeople in Cyprus
FK Partizan non-playing staff